Rita Verma (born 15 July 1953 in Patna) is an Indian politician and a member of the Bharatiya Janata Party. She is a former Minister of State of Mines and Minerals in the Indian government. She is a member of the faculty at SSLNT Women's College, Dhanbad in the subject of History.

Verma studied at Patna University, and taught history in Ranchi University. She was elected to the 10th Lok Sabha in 1991 from Dhanbad constituency in Bihar. She was re-elected to the Lok Sabha in 1996, 1998 and 1999 from the same constituency. She is widow of Randhir Prasad Verma, an IPS of Bihar cadre from 1974 batch who sacrificed his life while foiling an attempt to a bank robbery in Dhanbad where he was serving as the Superintendent of Police.

Early life
Mrs. Rita Verma was born in a karna Kayastha Family.

Positions held 
1999-2000 Minister of State of Mines and Minerals
2000 Minister of State of Health and Family Welfare
2000-01 Minister of State of Rural Development
2001-03 Minister of State of Human Resources Development
She was Member of Panel of Chairmen of Lok Sabha during 1996-97 and 1998–99 and Whip of the Bharatiya Janata Party (BJP) Parliamentary Party in 1998.

References 

Politicians from Patna
1953 births
Living people
India MPs 1991–1996
India MPs 1996–1997
India MPs 1998–1999
India MPs 1999–2004
Patna University alumni
Academic staff of Ranchi University
Women in Jharkhand politics
Lok Sabha members from Jharkhand
Bharatiya Janata Party politicians from Jharkhand
20th-century Indian women politicians
20th-century Indian politicians
21st-century Indian women politicians
21st-century Indian politicians
Women union ministers of state of India